Ransom is a 1928 American silent drama film directed by George B. Seitz and is considered to be lost. This is one of the many films of this period that sought to cash in on the fame of the then-popular Sax Rohmer Fu Manchu novels. Surprisingly, Columbia resorted to aping the character instead of attempting to secure the rights legally from the author. The following year, Paramount released the first of a Fu Manchu trilogy of films that were very successful.

Plot
An Asian mastermind named Wu Fang, who controls the Chinese underground in San Francisco, learns of the recent invention of a poisonous gas which can be used as a biological weapon, invented by a Dr. Burton Meredith. Wu Fang kidnaps Bobby, the young brother of Dr. Meredith's fiancee Lois, and offers to trade the boy's life for the secret formula. Lois goes to Wu Fang's secret hideout to rescue her brother but winds up being captured herself. Just as Wu Fang prepares to torture her, Dr. Meredith bursts in with the police and saves both captives in the nick of time.

Cast
 William V. Mong as Wu Fang
 Edmund Burns as Burton Meredith, scientist
 Lois Wilson as Lois Brewster, fiancee
 Jackie Combs as Bobby Brewster, the kid brother
 Blue Washington as Oliver
 James B. Leong as Scarface

References

External links
 
 
 

1928 films
American silent feature films
1928 drama films
Films directed by George B. Seitz
American black-and-white films
Columbia Pictures films
Lost American films
Silent American drama films
1928 lost films
Lost drama films
Films about chemical war and weapons
Films about organized crime in the United States
Films set in San Francisco
1920s American films
Silent war films